Elaine Cassidy (born 31 December 1979) is an Irish actress. She is best known for playing DC Dinah Kowalska in No Offence, Abby Mills in the American television series Harper's Island for CBS, Felicia in Felicia's Journey, Runt in Disco Pigs, Lydia in The Others, Amy Harris in The Ghost Squad and Katherine Glendenning in The Paradise.

Early life
Cassidy was born in Raheny, and moved with her family to Kilcoole when she was three years old. Her first role was as the title character in a school production of Pinocchio when she was five.

Career
In 1996, Cassidy was nominated for the Most Promising Actress at the Geneva Film Festival for her role in The Sun, the Moon and the Stars. She played the starring role in Felicia's Journey, for which she was nominated Best Actress at the 20th Genie Awards. She has won 2 Irish Film and Television Awards (IFTA) for Best Actress in a Lead Role in Film in 2003 for her role as Runt in Disco Pigs, and in 2010 for Best Actress in a Lead Role in Television for her role as Abby Mills in the American CBS TV series Harper's Island. She was also nominated for an IFTA in 2005 as Best Actress in a Lead Role in Television for her role as "Maud Lilly" in the BBC BAFTA nominated drama Fingersmith, in 2007 as Best Actress in a Supporting Role in Film for her role as Sandra in And When Did You Last See Your Father?, and in 2009 as Best Actress in a Lead Role in Television for her role as Annie Mulcahy in Little White Lie.

She is also a stage actress, appearing in The Lieutenant of Inishmore (2002) and The Crucible (2006) with the Royal Shakespeare Company and in There Came A Gypsy Riding at the Almeida Theatre in 2007. She appeared in the music video for Coldplay's "The Scientist". She plays DC Dinah Kowalska in No Offence and Sarah Manning in Acceptable Risk.

She also plays Maureen in the one-off ITV drama special of the book Just Henry, which was made into film in August 2011 and screened on ITV on 18 December 2011.

Personal life
Cassidy married English actor Stephen Lord, whom she met on the set of The Truth, on 31 December 2007. They live in Greenwich, London, with their daughter Kila (born 16 September 2009) and son Lynott Lord Cassidy (born  23 January 2013).

Filmography

Film

Television

Music video 
 "The Scientist" by Coldplay, as Passenger

Theatre
 The Lieutenant of Inishmore (2002)
 Scenes from the Big Picture (2003)
 The Crucible (2006)
 There Came a Gypsy Riding (2007)
 Fathers and Sons (2014)
 Deluge (2015)
 Les Liaisons Dangereuses (2015 to 2016)
 Aristocrats (2018)

Awards

References

External links
 
 The 5th IFTA

Living people
1979 births
20th-century Irish actresses
21st-century Irish actresses
Actresses from County Wicklow
Irish film actresses
Irish stage actresses
Irish television actresses
People from Raheny
Irish child actresses
Irish radio actresses